Sabit James is an Australian professional footballer who plays as a forward for Western United. He made his professional debut on 7 December 2021 in a FFA Cup match against A-League Men side Wellington Phoenix.

References

External links

Living people
Australian soccer players
Association football midfielders
Western United FC players
National Premier Leagues players
Year of birth missing (living people)